Caspar Tsui Ying-wai (born 1977) is a Hong Kong politician, government official and DAB party member. From 2020 to 2022, he has been Secretary for Home Affairs.

Early life 
Tsui graduated in social sciences from the University of Ottawa and holds a Master of Business Administration degree from the University of Manchester. He worked at several banks including HSBC in Canada, Bank of Montreal, Merrill Lynch and American Express Bank before becoming an investment services manager at Hang Seng Bank. He stepped into politics in 2006 when he joined the Democratic Alliance for the Betterment and Progress of Hong Kong (DAB), the largest pro-Beijing party in Hong Kong. He was the vice-chairman of its youth branch, the Young DAB, from 2007 to 2008.

Political career 
He joined the government in the appointed role of Political Assistant to the Secretary for Home Affairs in 2008, after he renounced his Canadian citizenship that year. In 2017 he became Under Secretary for Labour and Welfare. In April 2020, he was appointed Secretary for Home Affairs, while remaining a member of the DAB, succeeding Lau Kong-wah. Tsui, aged 43 when appointed, was the youngest cabinet minister; and also the first political assistant eventually promoted to cabinet since the system was installed.

In December 2020, Tsui said that freedom of speech for Hong Kong citizens is not "absolute," and that "[the] exercise by anyone of the right to freedom of expression carries with it special duties and responsibilities, and may therefore be subject to certain restrictions as provided by law as necessary for respect of the rights or reputations of others, or the protection of national security or of public order, or of public health or morals."

In April 2021, Tsui briefed the sports and culture industries on why the NPCSC implemented rules to only allow "patriots" to serve in the government, and asked for their full support.

Birthday party controversy 

On 5 January 2022, Chief Executive Carrie Lam announced new warnings and restrictions against social gathering due to potential COVID-19 outbreaks. One day later, it was discovered that Tsui attended a birthday party hosted by Witman Hung, with 222 guests. At least one guest tested positive with COVID-19, causing all guests to be quarantined.

On 25 January 2022, South China Morning Post reported that Chief Executive Carrie Lam wanted to fire Tsui from his post over the party scandal, but Lam encountered resistance from pro-establishment figures, including Tsui's party, the Democratic Alliance for the Betterment and Progress of Hong Kong (DAB). Both Ip Kwok-Him and Tam Yiu-chung were among those who had defended Tsui.

On 31 January 2022, Casper Tsui tendered his resignation to the Chief Executive. It was revealed that Tsui attended the party just hours after having had a meeting with core officials on tightening social-distancing rules. Carrie Lam confirmed Tsui did not use the mandatory "LeaveHomeSafe" app when entering the restaurant. The resignation was approved by the Chinese Government on 24 February.

Personal life 
Tsui is married. Together with his wife, he ones one unit at Parc Oasis in Kowloon Tong, after selling another unit and two parking spots for a profit of HK$6.475 million.

References 

Living people
1977 births
Government officials of Hong Kong
Members of the Executive Council of Hong Kong
Democratic Alliance for the Betterment and Progress of Hong Kong politicians
University of Ottawa alumni
Alumni of the University of Manchester
Hong Kong emigrants to Canada
Hong Kong bankers